Puan Sri Chelsia Chan, also known as Chan Chau Ha is Hong Kong based actress and singer-songwriter. Chan joined the music industry after winning the first prize at an amateur creative singing contest in 1975 in Hong Kong with the English song "Dark Side of Your Mind", which she composed with lyrics provided by her then-manager Pato Leung. Later, this became one of her best remembered songs. In 1976, at the age of 19, she won the leading actress award at Taiwan's Golden Horse Film Festival for the movie "Qiu Xia" (Chelsia My Love) which incidentally is also her own birth name. She is so far the youngest winner with the shortest screen life (seven years) in the Festival's history. Chan used to sing along with the Hong Kong group, The Wynners.

Chan is married to Lion Group Chairman, Tan Sri William Cheng.

Discography 
Singles

 Our Last Song Together/Where Are You? (1975)
 Little Bird ~ adapted from Kaze/Are You Still Mad at Me? (1975)

Albums

 Dark Side Of Your Mind (1975)
 Chelsia My Love (1976)
 Because Of You (1977)
 Love on A foggy River (1978)
 你不要走不要走 (1978) 　　　
 結婚三級跳 (1979) 　　　
 第二道彩虹 (1979)　　　
 Fly with Love (1979)
 A Sorrowful Wedding (1979)
 Flying Home (1980)
 Poor Chasers (1980)
 古寧頭大戰 (1980)

Filmography 

 Dreams of the journey (1977)

External links

http://hk.news.yahoo.com/060316/12/1m4gk.html

1957 births
Living people
20th-century Hong Kong women singers
Hong Kong film actresses
Hong Kong Mandopop singers
Hong Kong television actresses
20th-century Hong Kong actresses